Greggio is a comune (municipality) in the Province of Vercelli in the Italian region Piedmont, located about  northeast of Turin and about  north of Vercelli.

Greggio borders the following municipalities: Albano Vercellese, Arborio, Recetto, San Nazzaro Sesia, and Villarboit.

References

Cities and towns in Piedmont